Solpadeine is the brand name of a range of analgesic medication containing various amounts of paracetamol, ibuprofen, caffeine and codeine, made by Omega Pharma. The range was previously made by GlaxoSmithKline, which sold its portfolio of over-the-counter drugs to Omega Pharma in 2012.

In the United Kingdom there are four different medicines using the Solpadeine name, with no common active ingredient between them. The range includes:
 Solpadeine Headache, containing paracetamol with caffeine
 Solpadeine Plus, a compound analgesic containing paracetamol and codeine (co-codamol), with caffeine
 Solpadeine Max, a compound analgesic containing paracetamol and codeine (with a higher codeine content than Solpadeine Plus)
 Solpadeine Migraine, a compound analgesic containing ibuprofen and codeine

In 2016 it was one of the biggest selling branded over-the-counter medications sold in Great Britain, with sales of £43.1 million. 

In Australia it is marketed as Panadeine.

External links
  Solpadeine Website

References

Analgesics
GSK plc brands